Ole Bjørn Sundgot (born 21 March 1972) is a Norwegian former professional footballer who played as a striker, for Molde, Bradford City and Lyn. His brother is Arild Sundgot. Ole Bjørn Sundgot is currently the head coach of Sunndal IL in Norwegian 4th division (5th tier).

Playing career
Sundgot was born in Ulsteinvik and began his career at Hødd, before he joined Molde ahead of the 1991 season where he made his breakthrough, forming a striker partnership with Arild Stavrum and Ole Gunnar Solskjær. Solskjær famously moved to Manchester United while Sundgot spent a period on loan at English club Oldham Athletic, but never played a single first-team match due to injury. He was later snapped up by Chris Kamara at Bradford City. He played up front with Swedish striker Rob Steiner. Sundgot scored six goals in his first season but just a couple of months into the 1997–98 season he moved back to Molde. From there he later moved to Lyn and Hønefoss.

He was capped once by Norway, coming on as a substitute for Jostein Flo in a 1995 friendly against Ghana.

Managerial career
In 2008, he was hired as manager of Hønefoss, his last club as a player.

Personal life
Sundgot comes from a family of footballers, and is the son of former Hødd and Viking player Otto Sundgot and the brother of the former Lillestrøm player Arild Sundgot.

References

External links
Ole Bjørn Sundgot career stats at 100% Fotball, Norwegian Premier League stats

1972 births
Living people
People from Ulstein
Sportspeople from Møre og Romsdal
Norwegian footballers
Norway international footballers
Association football forwards
IL Hødd players
Molde FK players
Oldham Athletic A.F.C. players
Bradford City A.F.C. players
Lyn Fotball players
Hønefoss BK players
Eliteserien players
Norwegian First Division players
English Football League players
Norwegian football managers
Hønefoss BK managers
Norwegian expatriate footballers
Expatriate footballers in England
Norwegian expatriate sportspeople in England